The redoba is a percussion instrument.
It consists of a wood block fixed to a belt and struck with sticks. A pair of blocks can be used to obtain two different musical notes. It is possible to dance and play at the same time. It is mainly used in conjunto norteño.

References 

 
 

Mexican musical instruments
North American percussion instruments
Idiophones